The 1992 Arkansas Razorbacks football team represented the University of Arkansas during the 1992 NCAA Division I-A football season. Head coach Jack Crowe was fired after the first game, when Arkansas lost to FCS The Citadel. Joe Kines was promoted from defensive coordinator to interim head coach until the end of the season, when Danny Ford would be promoted to head man.

Despite the 3-7 record, the Hogs won their first game in the SEC by defeating South Carolina 45-7 at Williams-Brice Stadium. The season was highlighted by beating #4 Tennessee in a massive upset, thanks to a game-winning 41-yard field goal from kicker Todd Wright with just two seconds left in the game. Wright, who also secured two other 45+ yard field goals and a forced fumble, was named "player of the game" due to his efforts, a rare feat for a kicker. Arkansas also ended their season by upsetting highly-favored LSU in a 30-6 rout.

Schedule

Roster

References

Arkansas
Arkansas Razorbacks football seasons
Arkansas Razorbacks football